Ukhrul district (Meitei pronunciation:/ˈuːkˌɹəl or ˈuːkˌɹʊl/) is an administrative district of the state of Manipur in India with its headquarters at Ukhrul.

Geography
Ukhrul District occupying the northeastern corner of the state lies between latitudes of 24° 29′ and 25° 42′ N and longitudes 94° 30′ and 94° 45′ E approximately (including Kamjong district). Nagaland bounds the district on the north, Kamjong District on the south, Myanmar (Burma) on the east and Senapati and Kangpokpi Districts on the west. The north-south extension is longer than the east-west. The total area of the district is 4,544 square kilometres (1,754 sq mi) including Kamjong District. It has the distinction of being the highest hill station of Manipur. The terrain of the district is hilly with varying heights of 913 m to 3114 m (MSL). The highest peak is the Khayang Peak, at 3114 m (MSL), though the more popularly known peak is the Shirui Kashong Peak, at 2,835 m (MSL). Most of the major rivers originate from the crevices and slopes of this Shirui Peak. The terrain of the district is rippled with small ranges and striped by few rivers.

The northern hilly region occupies the northern portion of the district and lies between the Akhong Lok or Laini Lok river and Chammu river. A big range stretches from north to south starting from near Jessami to Shirui Kashong as high as 2,568 metres above the MSL. The eastern hilly region occupies the eastern part of the district that lies east of the Chammu and Maklangkhong rivers. The Gamgimol or Nehdoh Lhang range forms an International boundary with Myanmar. The southern hilly region is situated at the southwestern corner of the district, which divides the Maklangkhong and Taret rivers. The district is drained by the two river systems, the Chindwin River system in the north and the Manipur river system in the south-west.

Flora and fauna
The district is home to hundreds of varieties of trees and flowering plants, orchids, epiphytic ferns, varied species of plants and shrubs. Some of the best known species of plants and trees includes Alder (Alnus nepalensis), Prunus cerasoides, Acacia auriculiformis, Parkia javanica, Paraserianthes falcataria, Michelia, Gmelina arborea, Pinus kesiya, Robinia pseudoacacia, besides various Iris (plant) species, wild roses, red and white rhododendrons etc. The district being covered with a wide dense of forest is a habitat of wild animals such as Elephant, Leopard, Tiger, Bear, Bison, Gaur, Crested porcupine, Pangolin, Jungle cat, Wild boar, Deer, Monkey etc. The state flower of Manipur, Shirui Lily, also called Shirui Lily or Lilium Macklinae is a rare pinkish white flower found only in the Shirui Hill Range in the Ukhrul District of Manipur. It is named after Jean Macklin, the wife of Dr. Frank Kingdon-Ward who spotted the flower in 1946 while collecting botanical specimens. The Royal Horticultural Society (RHS), London, United Kingdom, one of the world's leading horticultural organizations honoured the Shirui Lily with its prestigious merit award at its Flower Show in London in 1948. The evergreen forest presents the district with a sylvan landscape. Some commonly found trees are Pine, Albizia, Castanopsis, Mesua, Mangifera indica, Phoebe hainesiana, Albizia lebbeck, Teak, Oak etc. The forests are also interspersed with multi-bamboos especially in the southern portions.

Though the State Flower, Shirui Lily have attracted many tourists and botanists from around the world, it now faces a crisis of possible extinction in the near future and has been categorized as an Endangered species due to climate change, deforestation, wildfire, poor conservation approaches, intrusion of other plants and bushes, over exploitation etc. Scientists and experts have advocated for the Shirui Lily to be left as it is in nature, and assured us that nature is capable of healing it without human interruptions caused by a forest fire and unguided tourists. They have also suggested number of steps and measures that can be taken up by the centre and state government and participation of various research institutions to raise awareness of protection of Shirui Lily and implementation of conservative initiatives.

Administrative divisions
The present district was made a full fledged district as Manipur East District in 1969. The village, Ukhrul, became its headquarters comprising Ukhrul North, Ukhrul Central, Phungyar Phaisat, Kamjong Chassad, Ukhrul South as sub-divisions. Under Manipur Gazette Notification No.174 dated August 5, 1983, the name of the district came to be  known as Ukhrul District after the name of the district headquarters as in the case of other districts.  

Ukhrul District has three assembly constituencies before the bifurcation of the district into Ukhrul and Kamjong Districts. The constituencies are:

 Phungyar Assembly Constituency (43-ST).
 Ukhrul Assembly Constituency (44-ST). 
 Chingai Assembly Constituency (45-ST).

The Ukhrul District Autonomous Council (UADC) was instituted in the year 1971 under the Manipur (Hill Areas) District Council Act, 1971.

Demographics 
According to the 2011 census Ukhrul district has a population of 183,998, roughly equal to the nation of São Tomé and Príncipe. This gives it a ranking of 593rd in India (out of a total of 640). Its population growth rate over the decade 2001-2011 was 30.07%. Ukhrul has a sex ratio of 948 females for every 1000 males, and a literacy rate of 81.87%. After birfucation, the district had a population of 138,382. Scheduled Castes and Scheduled Tribes make up 0.16% and 93.62% of the population respectively.

Languages

At the time of the 2011 census, 88.83% of the population spoke Tangkhul, 2.22% Thadou, 1.69% Kuki, 1.59% Nepali, 1.41% Khezha and 1.08% Hindi as their first language.

See also 

 List of populated places in Ukhrul district
 List of Naga people
 List of Naga tribes
 List of Naga languages

Notes

References

External links

Ukhrul District of Manipur
Ukhrul, India page at Falling Rain Genomics

 
1969 establishments in Manipur
Districts of Manipur
Minority Concentrated Districts in India